Bagayoko is a surname. Notable people with the surname include:

Amadou Bagayoko (born 1954), from musical duo Amadou & Mariam
Fatoumata Bagayoko (born 1988), Malian women's basketball player
Mamadou Bagayoko (born 1979), Malian international football striker
Mamadou Bagayoko (born 1989), Ivorian football defender
Oumar Bagayoko (born 1975), Malian footballer
Sekou Bagayoko (born 1987), Malian professional football player
Siaka Bagayoko (born 1998), Malian football defender